Endoclita nodus is a species of moth of the family Hepialidae. It is found in China (Anhui).

References

External links
Hepialidae genera

Moths described in 1985
Hepialidae